The 1987 UC Davis football team represented the University of California, Davis as a member of the Northern California Athletic Conference (NCAC) during the 1987 NCAA Division II football season. Led by 18th-year head coach Jim Sochor, UC Davis compiled an overall record of 8–2 with a mark of 5–0 in conference play, winning the NCAC title for the 17th consecutive season. 1986 was the team's 18th consecutive winning season. With the 5–0 conference record, the team stretched their conference winning streak to 36 games dating back to the 1981 season. The Aggies were ranked No. 10 in the final NCAA Division II poll. Unlike the previous five seasons, the Aggies did not qualify for the NCAA Division II Football Championship playoffs in 1987. The team outscored its opponents 238 to 163 for the season. The Aggies played home games at Toomey Field in Davis, California.

Schedule

Notes

References

UC Davis
UC Davis Aggies football seasons
Northern California Athletic Conference football champion seasons
UC Davis Aggies football